Rosalind Susan Gibson (née Alexander; born 20 November 1940) is a New Zealand nutrition academic. She is currently a professor emeritus and research professor at the University of Otago.

Early life and family
Gibson was born Rosalind Susan Alexander in Corbridge, Northumberland, England, on 20 November 1940. in 1963, she married geologist Ian Gibson, and the couple went on to have two children, a son and a daughter.  The son died as a result of a climbing accident; the daughter became a vet in New Zealand.

Academic career
Gibson completed a Bachelor of Science degree in human nutrition at the University of London in 1962. She then graduated Master of Science from the University of California, with a thesis titled  The inter-relationship of vitamins B6 and E. In 1979, she earned a PhD from the University of London, titled Use of hair as a biopsy material for the assessment of trace metal status in Canadian low birthweight infants.

Gibson worked as a research biochemist at the Institute of Orthopaedics at the University of London from 1962 to 1963. Between 1965 and 1968, she worked in Ethiopia as a nutritional biochemist at the Ethio-Swedish Children's Nutrition Unit in Addis Ababa. She then returned to Britain, as a lecturer in nutrition at Trinity and All Saints College from 1968 to 1971 and then at the Polytechnic of North London between 1971 and 1978. From 1977 to 1978, she was a research associate in nutrition at the Department of Pediatrics at Dalhousie University in Canada, before being appointed as a professor of applied human nutrition in the Department of Family Studies at the University of Guelph in 1979. She moved to the University of Otago in 1996, and was conferred with the title of professor emeritus in 2015.

In 2002, Gibson was elected a Fellow of the Royal Society of New Zealand. She was awarded the 2013 Kellogg International Prize in Nutrition.

Selected works

References

External links
 
 

1940 births
Living people
British emigrants to New Zealand
New Zealand women academics
Alumni of the University of London
Academic staff of the University of Otago
New Zealand nutritionists
New Zealand medical researchers
Fellows of the Royal Society of New Zealand
New Zealand women writers
People from Corbridge
Scientists from Northumberland
University of California, Los Angeles alumni
People associated with Leeds Trinity University
Academics of the University of North London
Academic staff of the University of Guelph